The Lord Leycester Hospital (often known simply as the Lord Leycester) is one of the best preserved examples of medieval courtyard architecture in England and is a charity supporting ex-servicemen. It is located in Warwick, England, next to the West Gate, on High Street. It is a Grade I listed building. The Hospital is a prominent and internationally famous feature of Warwick. For almost 900 years buildings have been erected and civic activity has taken place on the site, starting with the chapel built in 1126. The site was donated by the 12th Earl of Warwick in the 14th century to the United Guild of the Holy Trinity and St George. The Guild Hall, Great Hall and Master's House were constructed in the late 15th century. Over the centuries, the ancient buildings and 500 year old gardens have been admired by many famous visitors such as Charles Dickens and Oscar Wilde, by Kings and Queens, such as King George V and the Queen Mother and ordinary travellers from around the world.

History

12th Century 
The Lord Leycester Hospital started life as just the Chapel of St James the Great which was built over the West Gate of Warwick in 1126 by Roger de Newburgh, 2nd Norman Earl of Warwick.

14th Century 
In the late 14th century, it was rebuilt by the 12th Earl of Warwick. He granted the benefice of the Chapel in 1386 to the Guild of St George, a guild created on 20 April 1383 under licence from King Richard II. The Guild of the Holy Trinity and the Guild of the Blessed Virgin Mary joined them to form the United Guilds of Warwick. Living quarters and public rooms were added to the chapel including the Great Hall. These form the courtyard of the Lord Leycester that we see today.

15th Century 
The Guildhall was built in 1450 by Richard Neville "The Kingmaker", the 16th Earl of Warwick. It was primarily used as a private chamber where the Guilds met to discuss business. The table found in the center of the Guildhall is thought to have been the original table used by the United Guilds of Warwick where they discussed matters such as trade religion and politics.

16th Century 
The United Guilds were dispersed by King Henry VIII in 1546.  However, their property had already been transferred to the Burgesses of Warwick by Thomas Oken, Master of the Guilds. The burgesses used the property for meetings and for teaching as, what is now, Warwick School.

The 1st Earl of Leicester acquired the buildings in 1571, founding therein a hospital for aged or injured soldiers and their wives, under royal charter from Queen Elizabeth I, run by 12 resident "Brethren" (originally soldiers) under the charge of a "Master", and funded from the income of various estates.

17th Century 
In 1617 the Great Hall was used to entertain King James I on his visit to Warwick. The town was in debt for ten years as a result! Behind the back wall of the Great Hall is a plaque commemorating the occasion of the visit of the King but for an unknown reason it was covered over in Victorian times.

In 1694, the Great Fire of Warwick started at the Friends Meeting House in Warwick, across the High Street from the Lord Leycester Hospital. The fire was driven up the High Street by a strong South-Westerly wind and consumed virtually all buildings in its path. Thus, the original medieval timber-framed houses were destroyed and, in due course, replaced by the handsome stone and brick built buildings that you see today. Of the ancient buildings, only the Lord Leycester Hospital and its near neighbours survive.

19th Century 
The chapel was extensively restored by Sir Gilbert Scott in 1860. The story goes that a representative of his was called from dinner by worried townspeople who thought the chapel may fall down into the High Street. This included the addition of the flying buttresses which today skirt the chapel.

20th Century 

In 1956 the Corporation of the Master and Brethren of the Hospital was abolished by Act of Parliament and replaced with a board of Governors. On 3 November 1966 a restored Hospital with modernised quarters was opened by Queen Elizabeth the Queen Mother.

21st Century 

Today the Hospital is run by the Master, a retired officer of the Armed Forces.  Eight ex-servicemen and their wives are provided with flats in return for their past services: they act as guides for visitors. The Hospital is funded by visitor income, the original estates having been sold over the years. Heidi Meyer, the first woman to hold the office, was installed as Master in November 2017.

Other historical notes of interest include the fact that the Grade I listed stone urn in the Master's Garden is 2,000 years old and was originally part of an Egyptian nilometer. The Museum of the Queen's Own Hussars formed part of the collections of the hospital until it closed in 2016.

Key features

The Chapel of St. James the Great 
The carvings, notably the famous Warwick icon of the bear and ragged staff (or "baculus") and the two-tailed lion from the Dudley family coat of arms, illustrate the renowned craftsmanship in wood of Warwick men. The fine stained glass in the eastern window is the work of the Birmingham firm of Clayton & Bell. Above the south door is a gem of a window by William Morris who also designed the hangings around the altar.  Every weekday morning (except Mondays) the Master and Brethren gather for prayers in exactly the same wording directed by Robert Dudley almost 450 years before.

The Great Hall 
Apart from the floor, heating system and public restrooms at the far end, the Hall has changed very little in structure and appearance from the 1300s. It was used by the Guilds for public functions and this has been resumed today for dinners, dances, receptions, concerts and meetings.

The Guildhall 
The Guildhall, today, is used as display space for many of the artifacts collected throughout history. This includes a selection of weaponry, including flintlock muskets sent "by the crown" to the Brethren at the time of the Chartist Riots, Napoleonic swords, thought to have come from the Battle of Waterloo and a cannonball dug up from the Battle of Edge Hill.

List of weaponry in the Lord Leycester Hospital Guildhall 
Below is a list of weaponry that is featured in the Guildhall:

The Masters and Brethren
The soldiers living within the walls of the medieval building are known as the Brethren. The Master and the Brethren share a legacy of almost 450 years of history. They meet in the Chapel every day to pray together the words written by their founder the 1st Earl of Leicester. They are dressed in ceremonial uniforms and give tours through the buildings and gardens to the visitors. The public cafe based in the hospital is named The Brethren's Kitchen.

A list of masters of the Lord Leycester Hospital is as follows:

Television appearances
The building has been used in many historical-set television productions including Pride and Prejudice, Tom Jones, Moll Flanders, Shakespeare & Hathaway: Private Investigators, A Christmas Carol and the 2007 Doctor Who episode The Shakespeare Code.

Images

References

External links

Official website
British History Online Extract on the history of the Lord Leycester Hospital
E.G. Tibbits, "The Hpspital of Robert, Earl of Leicester and Warwick" published in Birmingham Archaeological Society Transactions, 1936, Vol. LX, pp. 113–144
A. Nicholls, "Almshouses in Early Modern England Charitable Housing in the Mixed Economy of Welfare 1550-1725", (2017)
 

 


Buildings and structures completed in 1146
Buildings and structures completed in 1450
Tourist attractions in Warwickshire
Hospitals in Warwickshire
Buildings and structures in Warwick
1571 establishments in England
Grade I listed buildings in Warwickshire
Timber framed buildings in Warwickshire
English medieval hospitals and almshouses